The 1978 San Diego State Aztecs football team represented San Diego State University during the 1978 NCAA Division I-A football season as a member of the Western Athletic Conference (WAC). This was the Aztecs' first season in the WAC.

The team was led by head coach Claude Gilbert, in his sixth year, and played home games at San Diego Stadium in San Diego, California. They finished with a record of four wins and seven losses (4–7, 2–4 WAC).

Schedule

Team players in the NFL
The following were selected in the 1979 NFL Draft.

The following finished their college career in 1978, were not drafted, but played in the NFL.

Team awards

Notes

References

San Diego State
San Diego State Aztecs football seasons
San Diego State Aztecs football